Zubanchi is a rural locality (a selo) in Dakhadayevsky District, Republic of Dagestan, Russia. The population was 1,638 as of 2010. There are 7 streets.

Nationalities 
Dargins live there.

Geography
Zubanchi is located 11 km southeast of Urkarakh (the district's administrative centre) by road. Zilbachi and Trisanchi are the nearest rural localities.

References 

Rural localities in Dakhadayevsky District